VA-210 may refer to:
Attack Squadron 210 (U.S. Navy)
State Route 210 (Virginia)